National Tertiary Route 620, or just Route 620 (or ) is a National Road Route of Costa Rica, located in the Puntarenas province.

Description
In Puntarenas province the route covers Puntarenas canton (Monte Verde district).

References

Highways in Costa Rica